Tenson may refer to:

 Tenso, a style of troubadour song
 Tenson (brand), a brand of clothing based in Sweden
 Tenson Shrine (天孫神社), a Shinto shrine located in Ōtsu, Shiga, Japan
 Tenson dynasty (天孫王朝), the legendary first royal dynasty of the Ryukyu Islands founded by Tenson

See also

 Tenson kōrin (天孫降臨), descendants of Ninigi (grandson of Amaterasu)
Tonson (surname)